Sverre Hartmann (2 May 1917 – 22 September 2003) was a Norwegian historian and jurist. He was born in Borgund.  His research interests primarily focused on Norway during World War II. Among his books are Spillet on Norge from 1958 and Fører uten folk from 1959.

Selected works

References

1917 births
2003 deaths
20th-century Norwegian historians